Vosne-Romanée is a commune in the Côte-d'Or department in Bourgogne-Franche-Comté in eastern France.

Population

Wine

It produces the region's most celebrated wines, all made entirely from the Pinot noir grape: "There can be little doubt that in the firmament of the Côte de nuits, Vosne-Romanée is the brightest star"

Despite the monopoly control of four of the six grand crus, the village has at least forty growers sharing its vineyards.

The wines produced from the vineyards are diverse, but they are generally considered to be rich, silky and well balanced, with a complexity which surpasses that of the other wines of Burgundy.

In addition to many excellent wines at both the village and premier cru level, the village has six grand crus.

Romanée-Conti
The Romanée-Conti vineyard dominates the village, with its wines among the most expensive in the world. It is a monopole of Domaine de la Romanée-Conti. Around 600 cases are made each year from the vineyard's 1.8 ha. Its highly sought after wine develops strongly over several decades.

La Romanée
La Romanée is a monopole of the Domaine Liger-Belair. Only 300 cases are made each year from this plot of 0.84 ha.

La Tâche
La Tâche is Domaine de la Romanée Conti's other monopole, and its 6 ha consist of the vineyards of La Tâche and Les Gaudichots. The wine is notable for being excellent at a very young age, and is of consistent quality even in otherwise poor vintages.

Richebourg
The 8 ha of the Richebourg cru are divided between 10 growers, including Domaine Leroy and Domaine de la Romanée Conti. Its wines are often described as "voluptuous".

Romanée-Saint-Vivant
The wine of Romanée-Saint-Vivant suffers in comparison to its neighbours, making a lighter and less powerful liquid. Once again Domaine de la Romanée Conti owns over half of the area's 9.5 ha.

La Grande Rue
The least-renowned of the six grands crus is La Grande Rue, a monopole of Domaine François Lamarche, and was only promoted from premier cru status in 1992. Its 1.4 hectares lie between La Tâche and Romanée-Conti.

Premiers Crus
Although unable to command the same prices as their grand cru neighbours, the village is home to many excellent premier cru wines. The top vineyards include Les Gaudichots, Les Malconsorts, Les Suchots, Cros Parantoux, Les Chaumes, and Clos des Réas (a monopole of Domaine Michel Gros).

See also
 Communes of the Côte-d'Or department
 Route des Grands Crus

References

External links

Domaine Michel Gros
Official website

Communes of Côte-d'Or